Daniel Orsanic and Olli Rahnasto were the defending champions, but none competed this year.

Neil Broad and Greg Van Emburgh won the title by defeating Jordi Arrese and Renzo Furlan 6–4, 7–6 in the final.

Seeds

Draw

Draw

References

External links
 Official results archive (ATP)
 Official results archive (ITF)

San Marino CEPU Open
1994 ATP Tour